Reggie Kinlaw (born January 9, 1957) is a former American football defensive tackle who played college football for the Oklahoma Sooners and Professionally for the Oakland/Los Angeles Raiders and Seattle Seahawks in the National Football League. He graduated from Miami Springs Senior High School.

Drafted in the final round of the 1979 NFL Draft, Kinlaw soon worked his way into the rotation on the defensive line. He went on to become a mainstay at the nose tackle position, starting on Raider Super Bowl winners following the 1980 and 1983 seasons. He was considered an unsung hero on those defenses, which featured stars like Ted Hendricks, Rod Martin, Matt Millen, and, later, Howie Long, Lyle Alzado, and Greg Townsend. Despite being somewhat undersized at 6-2 and 250 pounds, Kinlaw's quickness demanded double teams, freeing up his teammates to make big plays. "Reggie was the REAL hero of our defense! He was so quick, they always had to double-team him. That would allow us, in the secondary, to make plays." - Lester Hayes, CB, Raiders.

Reggie Kinlaw coached the defensive line at the varsity level at St. Francis High School in La Cañada, Flintridge, California.  His son Reggie Kinlaw, Jr. also coached the defensive line on the Junior Varsity level at St. Francis High School. With the announcement (in 2015) of the Raiders moving to Las Vegas, Reggie permanently moved to Las Vegas as well.

References

1957 births
Living people
American football defensive tackles
Los Angeles Raiders players
Oakland Raiders players
Oklahoma Sooners football players
Seattle Seahawks players
High school football coaches in California
Miami Springs Senior High School alumni
Players of American football from Miami
Coaches of American football from Florida